Battle River—Crowfoot is a federal electoral district in Alberta.

Battle River—Crowfoot was created by the 2012 federal electoral boundaries redistribution and was legally defined in the 2013 representation order. It came into effect upon the call of the 42nd Canadian federal election, scheduled for October 2015. It was created out of parts of the electoral districts of Crowfoot and Vegreville—Wainwright.

Even by the standards of rural Alberta, Battle River—Crowfoot is a strongly conservative riding. The riding and its predecessors have been represented by centre-right MPs for all but two years since 1935, and the major right-wing party of the day has usually won here in massive landslides. Since the 1990s, the major right-wing party of the day has won by some of the largest margins ever recorded in Canadian politics, with other parties lucky to get 30 percent of the vote between them. Its first member, Kevin Sorenson, was first elected for Crowfoot in 2000 with 70 percent of the vote–the only time that he garnered less than 80 percent of the vote.  The current MP, Damien Kurek, won in 2019 with more than 85% of the vote.

Members of Parliament

This riding has elected the following members of the House of Commons of Canada:

Election results

Towns/Villages/Cities in Battle River—Crowfoot

References

Alberta federal electoral districts
Camrose, Alberta
Drumheller